The Caribbean Song Festival was an annual song competition held among countries that are members of the Caribbean Broadcasting Union (CBU). It was the largest and highest rated song competition of the Caribbean.
It is often referred to as the Eurovision Song Contest of the Caribbean, and sometimes mistakenly called the CBU Festival.

Each competing Island and country holds a National Song Festival where a winner is chosen.  This is aired on live television at the National competition via one of the national CBU-member television stations. The National winner and song will then be submitted to the international competition. At the Caribbean Song Festival, the finalists  represent their country.

The show has been broadcast on live television since it premiered in 1984. "Hold You in a Song" by John King and Alison Hinds won the 1992 edition of the Caribbean Song Festival.

References

Song contests